Cigarette tubes are pre-rolled cigarette paper usually with an acetate or paper filter at the end. They have an appearance similar to a finished cigarette but are without any tobacco or smoking material inside. The length varies from what is known as King Size (84mm) to 100's (100mm).

Filling a cigarette tube is usually done with a cigarette injector (also known as a shooter) or with filling machine. Russian old style papirosa cigarette tube can also be filled with filling machine. Cone shaped cigarette tubes are known as cones and can be filled using a packing stick or straw because of their cone shape. Cone smoking is popular because as the cigarette burns it tends to get stronger and stronger. A cone allows more tobacco to be burned at the beginning than the end, allowing for an even flavor 

The United States Tobacco Taxation Bureau defines a cigarette tube as "Cigarette paper made into a hollow cylinder for use in making cigarettes."

References

Cigarettes